Vriesea longiscapa is a plant species in the genus Vriesea.

The bromeliad is endemic to the Atlantic Forest biome (Mata Atlantica Brasileira), located in southeastern Brazil.

References

longiscapa
Endemic flora of Brazil
Flora of the Atlantic Forest